Günther Janse van Vuuren (born 24 August 1995) is a South African rugby union player for the  in the Pro14, the  in the Currie Cup and the  in the Rugby Challenge. His regular position is tighthead prop.

Rugby career

2013: Schoolboy rugby

Janse van Vuuren was born in Pretoria, but attended Hoërskool Monument in Krugersdorp.

2014–2016: Free State Cheetahs and CUT Ixias

He started ten matches for the  team in the 2014 Under-19 Provincial Championship regular season, scoring a try in a 7–9 defeat to the s as Free State finished the season in second spot on the log to secure a semi-final berth. Janse van Vuuren also started in the semi-final, but could not prevent his side losing 22–29 at home to eventual champions .

In the first half of 2015, Van Vuuren was included in the  squad that participated in the 2015 Vodacom Cup.

In the second half of 2015, Van Vuuren played for the  team in the 2015 Under-21 Provincial Championship. He scored one try in their 58–12 victory over  en route to a second-place finish on the log.

Van Vuuren started the 2016 season by representing university side  in the 2016 Varsity Cup. He appeared in all seven of their matches in the competition, helping them to two victories and sixth place on the log. He made three more starts and one substitute appearance in the remainder of the season, as his side finished sixth in the fifteen-team competition. In May 2016, the Cheetahs announced that he signed a two-year contract extension, to remain in Bloemfontein until 2018.

In November 2016, Van Vuuren was named in the  Super Rugby team's training squad as the team prepared for the 2017 Super Rugby season.

References

Alumni of Monument High School
South African rugby union players
Living people
1995 births
Rugby union players from Pretoria
Rugby union props
Free State Cheetahs players
Cheetahs (rugby union) players
Boland Cavaliers players